Dominik Schmid (born 7 September 1989) is an Austrian handball player for Alpla HC Hard and the Austrian national team.

References

1989 births
Living people
Austrian male handball players
People from Bregenz
Sportspeople from Vorarlberg